Dirty Projectors is the seventh studio album by American experimental rock group Dirty Projectors, which was released on Domino Records on February 21, 2017.

Reception

Dirty Projectors received positive reviews from music critics, holding a rating of 77 out of 100 on the review aggregator website Metacritic.

Track listing

Samples
 "Keep Your Name" contains a sample of "Sheathed Wings" by Dan Deacon
 "Death Spiral" contains a sample of "Scene d'Amour", written by Bernard Hermann from the album Vertigo - Original Motion Picture Score

Personnel

Dirty Projectors 
 David Longstreth – vocals (all tracks), beat (all tracks), guitar (tracks 1–3, 5, 7, 9), rhodes (tracks 1, 2, 4, 5, 7), synths (tracks 1, 2, 6–9), piano (track 1, 2, 4, 8), string arrangement (tracks 4, 5, 7, 9), bass (tracks 2, 5, 7), wurlitzer (tracks 2, 4), organ (tracks 6, 8), horn arrangement (track 3), arp (track 4)

Additional musicians
 Ryan Beppel – string arrangement (track 7)
 Tyondai Braxton – modular synth (tracks 1–3, 7, 8)
 Lamar "Mars" Edwards – Hammond organ (track 9)
 David Ginyard – bass (track 3)
 Juliane Gralle – trombone (3 and 7), bass trombone (track 3), tuba (track 3)
 Clarice Jensen – cello (tracks 4, 5, 7, 9)
 Mike Daniel Johnson – drums (tracks 2, 3, 5)
 Elizabeth Lea – trombone (track 5)
 Daniel Luna – guira (track 8)
 Rob Moose – violin (tracks 4, 5, 7, 9)
 Francisco Javier Paredes – bongos (track 8)
 Mauro Refosco – percussion (tracks 1–4, 6, 8, 9), marimba (track 6)
 Dawn Richard – vocals (track 8)
 Ben Russell – violin (tracks 4, 5, 7, 9)
 Todd Simon – trumpet (tracks 3, 8), euphonium (track 3), flugelhorn (track 8)
 Nadia Sirota – viola (tracks 4, 5, 7, 9)
 Tracy Wannomae – tenor sax (track 3), alto sax (track 3), clarinet (track 3), bass clarinet (track 3), flute (track 3), baritone sax (track 8)

Recording
 Chris Athens – mastering
 Derek Bergheimer – vocal engineering (track 8)
 Mikaelin "Blue" Bluespruce – engineering (track 8)
 Tyondai Braxton – additional production (tracks 1–3, 7, 8)
 Sonny DiPerri – drum and percussion engineering (tracks 1–7), mixing (track 8), additional engineering (track 9)
 Jimmy Douglass – mixing, additional engineering (vocals) (track 4)
 David Longstreth – producer, mixing
 David Tolomei – additional mixing (tracks 1, 2, 7, 8)
 Ryan Tuttle – engineering
 Jamie Walters – string quartet engineering (tracks 4, 5, 7)

Charts

Notes

References

2017 albums
Domino Recording Company albums
Dirty Projectors albums
Albums produced by David Longstreth